Love Yourself: Her (stylized as LOVE YOURSELF 承 'Her') is the fifth extended play by South Korean boy group BTS. The EP was released on September 18, 2017, by Big Hit Entertainment. The album was released in four versions and contains nine tracks, with "DNA" as its lead single.

Background 

Love Yourself: Her is the first album to be released since BTS revealed their new "brand identity" on July 4, 2017, complete with a new, simplified logo. On September 18, the album was released alongside the music video for its lead single, "DNA". In the 24 hours after release, the "DNA" music video had been viewed 21 million times, becoming the first K-pop group music video to reach over 20 million views in 24 hours.

Composition
Sonically, the EP served as "a dual exploration of the group's electro-pop and hip-hop leanings," with the first half consisting of "dance tracks that emphasize the group's vocals" while in the second half "the act's hip-hop side arrives in earnest...delivering powerful rap performances."

"Love Yourself" series which sought the enlightenment of self-love through the "起承轉結" (Korean: 기승전결; RR: Giseungjeongyeol) narrative sequence of "beginning, development, turn, and conclusion." In the narrative sequence, the EP represented the "承," or "development" of the series and is considered by RM to be one of the major turning points in BTS' career. Within the larger narrative, Love Yourself: Her described the joy and happiness of falling in love.

Commercial performance
Love Yourself: Her recorded 1,051,546 stock pre-orders during the period dated August 25–31, making BTS the first K-pop group to reach and cross one million pre-orders with a single album. The EP debuted at number one on the South Korean Gaon Album Chart, while its lead single "DNA" debuted at number two on the Gaon Digital Chart—all tracks from the EP also placed in the top 40 of the chart. According to the monthly Album Chart, released on October 14, the album was the highest-selling release of September 2017, with 1,203,533 copies sold since its release on September 18. The album also had the second highest monthly sales in the history of the Gaon Chart, and was the first in 16 years to exceed 1.2 million copies sold since g.o.d's fourth album Chapter 4 (2001). It won the grand prize at the 32nd Golden Disc Awards in the Physical Category on January 11, 2018, and went on become BTS' highest-selling album at the time, surpassing Wings (2016).  It is one of the best-selling albums in Gaon Chart history, with over 2.2 million copies sold as of April 2020.

The EP opened at number seven on the US Billboard 200 with 31,000 album-equivalent units—18,000 were pure album sales—marking the biggest sales week for a K-pop album on the chart and making it the highest-charting K-pop album in Billboard chart history, until the release of BTS' own Love Yourself: Tear in 2018. BTS became the first Asian artist in seven years to debut within the top ten of the chart, surpassing the record set by Filipino singer Charice who debuted at number eight in 2010 with her eponymous American debut album. The album remained on the Billboard 200 for 44 weeks, becoming the first Korean album to do so. Following its reissue on vinyl in 2023, Love Yourself: Her sold a further 21,000 units in the country and reentered the top 20 of the Billboard 200 at number 13, on the issue dated January 21, 2023, marking its 45th non-consecutive week on the chart. It was the second best-selling album of the week overall, and the best-selling release on the format, with 18,000 pure sales, earning BTS their first number one on the Vinyl Albums chart. It also repeaked atop the World Albums chart for the same issue date.

Elsewhere, the EP peaked at number one on the Oricon Albums Chart in Japan in its second week, 
and earned BTS their debut on the UK Albums Chart when it peaked at number 14 on the issue dated October 7, 2017.

Reception

Billboard writer Tamar Herman described the EP as "a dual exploration of the group's electro-pop and hip-hop leanings", with the first half consisting of “dance tracks that emphasize the group's vocals" while in the second half "the act's hip-hop side arrives in earnest...delivering powerful rap performances." Viri Garcia of The Cornell Daily Sun commended BTS for "trying to achieve a sound closer to pop while keeping their own signature sounds" and succeeding in creating a "masterpiece full of emotion and musicality that can't be paralleled by any American or Korean act." However, Monique Melendez from Spin summarized the album as "thematically confident in its separate halves but musically disparate", with the group refusing to compromise on a specific musical direction. Melendez further commented that Love Yourself 承 'Her''' came up short compared to BTS' past works, such as Wings and The Most Beautiful Moment in Life, Part 1 and Part 2, in which "visuals, lyrics, and sounds united under fully-realized concepts."

The EP's lead single "DNA" was featured on Vulture as one of the "8 Best New Songs of the Week", describing the track as the "sound of a boy band headed in a new direction plotted for crossover domination“ and one that "recategorizes BTS by shrugging off genre entirely." The New York Times pop music critic Jon Caramanica wrote that while BTS' music often exhibits the “flamboyance and sometimes manic energy" that is characteristic of K-pop, Love Yourself: Her'' takes a remarkably "tranquil approach” to the genre through side tracks such as "Pied Piper", which he described as "a slow disco number that's emphatic in its relaxation." Caramanica additionally highlighted "Outro: Her" as a track with a hip hop beat that is "lush with instrumentation, and moves with a casual saunter reminiscent of the mid 1990s." Tamar Herman also offered praises for the lyrical delivery of "Pied Piper", and stated, "A take on K-pop's rampant and highly profitable fan culture, 'Pied Piper,' is BTS doing what they do best: addressing a societal problem through their jaunty music." Herman called the track "BTS' most subversive song of their career."

Accolades

Track listing
The credits are adapted from the official album profile on Naver.

Charts

Weekly charts

Monthly charts

Year-end charts

Certifications and sales

Release history

See also
 List of K-pop songs on the Billboard charts
 List of K-pop albums on the Billboard charts
 List of Gaon Album Chart number ones of 2017

References

2017 EPs
BTS EPs
Korean-language EPs
Grand Prize Golden Disc Award-winning albums
Hybe Corporation EPs